Krigia occidentalis, known as western dwarfdandelion, is a North American species of plants in the family Asteraceae. It is native to the southern Great Plains and the Ozark Mountains of the south-central United States (Kansas, Missouri, Arkansas, Oklahoma, Texas, Louisiana).

Krigia occidentalis is a small annual herb, rarely more than 16 cm (6.4 inches) tall, with a taproot. The plant produces only one flower head per flower stalk, each head with 5–25 yellow ray flowers but no disc flowers.

References

External links
Photo of herbarium specimen at Missouri Botanical Garden, collected in Missouri in 1914

Cichorieae
Flora of the Great Plains (North America)
Endemic flora of the United States
Ozarks
Plants described in 1834
Taxa named by Thomas Nuttall
Flora without expected TNC conservation status